McLeese Lake is an unincorporated community on British Columbia Highway 97 in the Cariboo region of the Central Interior of British Columbia, Canada.  It is named for the lake of the same name, which itself was named for Robert McLeese, a pioneer storekeeper, hotelier and steamboat owner and also politician.

McLeese Lake is home to the Gibraltar Mine, Canada's second-largest open pit copper mine, which is located approximately 10km north of town.  In addition to copper, the Gibraltar Mine also mines Molybdenum.

References

Designated places in British Columbia
Geography of the Cariboo
Unincorporated settlements in British Columbia